Edwin Bafcop (born 24 December 1962 in Poperinge) is a Belgium former professional road bicycle racer.

Major results
Source:

1984
 2nd Ghent–Wevelgem U23
1986
 10th Grand Prix de Fourmies
1987
 7th Grand Prix de Rennes
1988
 1st Grand Prix de Fourmies
 2nd Kampioenschap van Vlaanderen
 8th Halle–Ingooigem
1989
 2nd Circuito de Getxo
 3rd Cholet-Pays de la Loire
 4th Omloop van de Westhoek
 9th GP Stad Zottegem
1990
 1st GP de la Ville de Rennes
 6th Giro dell'Etna
 8th Cholet-Pays de la Loire
 10th Memorial Samyn
1991
 2nd Tour de Vendée
 3rd Omloop van de Westhoek
 10th Scheldeprijs
1992
 9th Circuit des Frontières

Grand Tour general classification results timeline
Source:

References

External links

Belgian male cyclists
1962 births
Living people
People from Poperinge
Cyclists from West Flanders